Gelsmoor is a hamlet within the parish of Worthington  in the English county of Leicestershire.

It is noted for having a 'petrifying spring' in a nineteenth-century gazetteer, and also a Wesleyan Chapel.

References 

Hamlets in Leicestershire
North West Leicestershire District